Robber's Cave may refer to:

Caves
 Daneil's Cave, also called the Robber's Cave, in Saxony-Anhalt, Germany
 Robber's Cave, India, a river cave formation in Uttarakhand, India
 Robber's Cave in Lincoln, Nebraska, USA
 Robber's Cave in the Blaise Castle estate, Bristol, England

Other uses
 Robbers Cave study, an experiment in Realistic conflict theory
 Robbers Cave State Park, Latimer County, Oklahoma, USA